Club Sport Áncash is a Peruvian football club, playing in the city of Huaraz. Sport Áncash was founded on April 22, 1967. The team plays its home games at Rosas Pampa stadium.

History

Beginnings
The club was founded in 1960 by a group of young men from Huaraz and Chacas in Ancash. The team was named Sport Áncash after the street where many of the players lived which disappeared after the 1970 Ancash earthquake. The club was re-established on April 22, 1967 as Club Deportivo Comunitario Laboral Sport Áncash by one of the local labor unions. The club played for many years in the liga distrital de Huaraz. For many years after the earthquake the club was owned by various state and union organizations until 2004 when the future congressman José Mallqui took over as club president.

Significant Copa Perú Campaigns
The club would reach some national recognition when it reached the national stage of the 1976 Copa Perú. During the first years of the Copa Perú the six regional champions played a round robin tournament in Lima in which the team with the most points was promoted to the Peruvian Primera División. In 1976 Sport Áncash qualified to the final round robin. It reached the last game tied in points against Coronel Bolognesi. They would go on to lose 2–0 and with that lose its chances of reaching the Torneo Descentralizado.
Sport Áncash would reach the regional stage in 1998 and 1999 but would not qualify to the national stage until 2000. During the 2000 Copa Perú, the club faced Atletico Grau. They would lose their away game 1–0 and win at home 0–3. Because only points and not goals were taken into consideration a play-off game was played on neutral ground in Lima where the club lost 3–1.

2004 Copa Perú Championship
In 2004 under the leadership of José Mallqui as president and Tito Chumpitaz as coach, Sport Áncash would win the Copa Perú and make it to the Peruvian Primera División for the first time. Sport Áncash and Jose Gálvez both classified to the regional stage that year as departamental champion and runner-up respectively. Even though they were both seeded into different groups they played each other in the regional final which Sport Áncash won by 1–0. Both teams would also qualify to the national stage where they met again in the quarterfinals. Jose Gálvez won the first leg 4–1 and Sport Áncash the second 3–2. In a neutral play-off in Lima, Sport Áncash beat its departamental rival 1–0 to reach the semifinals. In the semifinals they defeat Sport Alfonso Ugarte with a global score of 3–2. 
In the finals they defeated one of the oldest teams in the country, Deportivo Municipal, who had qualified as the 2004 Peruvian Segunda División runner-up. Because the Peruvian Segunda División was only played by Lima clubs at the time the Peruvian Football Federation took its promotion berth and had the winner and runner-up automatically qualify to the Copa Perú national stage. The first leg was played in Huaraz and the second in the Estadio Nacional in Lima. Sport Áncash won by a global score of 4–1 and was promoted to the 2005 Torneo Descentralizado season.

Years in Peruvian top-flight
Sport Áncash started its first season in the first division with many of its players from the Copa Perú and with Rafael Castañeda as coach. Its first year it finished 6th in the aggregated table as the best team not qualified to an international tournament. 
2006 was not a good year for the club which had to fight to avoid relegation for most of the year. They should have been relegated anyway because of inscription problem with its squad members were it not for a questionable amnesty granted by the Peruvian Football Federation. 
2007 was the best year for the club. Sport Áncash finished 3rd during the Torneo Apertura and 6th during the Torneo Clausura only three points away from the tournament champion. Over all it finished 3rd in the league which qualified it for the first international tournament in its history, the 2008 Copa Sudamericana alongside Universitario de Deportes.
During 2008 the club finished 12th during the Torneo Apertura which saw the coach Jose Torres sacked. With the help of Antonio Alzamendi, Sport Áncash was able to fight for the Torneo Clausura and finish 3rd and 6th in the aggregated table only staying away from another international tournament by goal difference.
In 2009 the club was not able to save itself from relegation by finishing 15th in the new 16 teams tournament only one point away from the 14th place occupied by Alianza Atletico. By this time the club owners started accumulating a massive debt which would later bring the club's down fall.

First Segunda Division Era
For the 2010 season the club finished 2nd in its first year in the Peruvian Segunda División behind Cobresol. José Mallqui was joined by Reynaldo Huayaney in an effort to control the massive amount of debt that the club carried over from its bad year in the Torneo Descentralizado. During the 2011 and 2012 seasons the club had two great years tainted by debt which saw it lose 12 points and 4 points respectively at the end of the tournament which brought it down from 2nd to 4th place during both tournaments. In 2013, Sport Áncash was not able to finish the season and the team folded.

Resurgence
In September 2013 the club collapse because of accumulation of debt and was re-launched by Mallqui under the name Sport Áncash Fútbol Club as a way to scape its many acreditors. This team started playing at the second division level in the Liga Distrital de Huaraz. By 2014 the club was once again in the local first division league completing a mediocre campaign. In 2015, Sport Áncash F.C. reached the national stage once again and was defeated in the quarterfinals by Cristal Tumbes. Because of its good performance it was invited to participate once more in the Peruvian Segunda División after a long financial examination during the 2016 season. During their first season in the Peruvian Segunda División, Sport Áncash tied on points with Academia Cantolao from Callao and forced a title play-off match which they lost 2–0.

International tournaments

In 2008, in their first international participation, they faced Ñublense of Chile for the Copa Sudamericana. They lost in their visit 1–0 in Concepción and then they won 4–0 in Huancayo. In the second stage they faced Palmeiras of Brazil, being eliminated after drawing 0–0 in Lima and a lost 1–0 in São Paulo.

Rivalries
Sport Áncash has had a long-standing rivalry with José Gálvez. The two clubs have had the distinction of being the only clubs to face each other in the top five levels of the Peruvian football league system and the now defunct domestic cup league, Copa del Inca. Sport Áncash has recently gained a rivalry against Sport Rosario who are also from Huaraz.

Historic Badges

Honours

National

League
Segunda División:
Runner-up (2): 2010, 2016

Copa Perú:
Winners (1): 2004

National cups
Copa Inca:
Runner-up (1): 2011

Regional
Región II:
Winners (2): 2000, 2004
 Runner-up (2): 1998, 1999

Liga Departamental de Ancash:
Winners (10): 1976, 1981, 1987, 1992, 1998, 1999, 2000, 2004, 2015, 2018
 Runner-up (7): 1973, 1974, 1975, 1979, 1982, 2001, 2003

Liga Provincial de Ancash:
Winners (15): 1976, 1979, 1981, 1987, 1992, 1998, 1999, 2000, 2001, 2003, 2004, 2015, 2018, 2019, 2022

Liga Distrital de Ancash:
Winners (12): 1976, 1979, 1981, 1987, 1992, 1998, 1999, 2000, 2001, 2003, 2004, 2015
 Runner-up (3): 2002, 2019, 2022

Friendly National 
Copa Líbero:
Winners (1): 2006

Performance in CONMEBOL competitions
Copa Sudamericana: 1 appearance
2008: Round of 16

Sport Áncash in South America

Current squad 2016

Notable players

See also
List of football clubs in Peru
Peruvian football league system

References 

Football clubs in Peru
Association football clubs established in 1967